Bhiwandi Lok Sabha constituency is one of the 48 Lok Sabha (parliamentary) constituencies of Maharashtra state in western India. This constituency came into existence on 19 February 2008 as a part of the implementation of the Presidential notification based on the recommendations of the Delimitation Commission of India constituted on 12 July 2002.

Assembly segments
Presently, Bhiwandi Lok Sabha constituency comprises six Vidhan Sabha (legislative assembly) segments. These segments are:

Members of Parliament

Election results

2019

2014

2009

See also
 Thane district
 List of Constituencies of the Lok Sabha

Notes

External links
Bhiwandi lok sabha constituency election 2019 results details

Lok Sabha constituencies in Maharashtra
Lok Sabha constituencies in Maharashtra created in 2008
Bhiwandi
Politics of Thane district